MS Ryndam may refer to:

 MS Ryndam (1993), now the Pacific Aria, a cruise ship launched in 1993
 MS Ryndam (2021), ship under construction for Holland America Line and later renamed MS Rotterdam 

Ship names